The Greater Cleveland Aquarium is an aquarium in Cleveland, Ohio, USA. The facility is the only independent, free-standing aquarium in the state of Ohio and ended a 26-year period that the city lacked a public aquarium.

History

A former Cleveland Aquarium opened on February 6, 1954, and was located on the city's near-east side in Gordon Park. It was created by the Cleveland Aquarium Society, a group formed in the 1940s, the City of Cleveland and the Cleveland Museum of Natural History, which operated the facility. The aquarium was housed in a building constructed in the 1930s that previously served as bath house. In 1943, the Cleveland Museum of Natural History converted it into a trailside museum, displaying local flora and fauna as well as exhibits of freshwater fish of Lake Erie. That museum closed in 1953 when the Cleveland Memorial Shoreway cut Gordon Park in two.

In the early 1950s, the Cleveland Museum of Natural History, which had previously had aquatic exhibits on its second floor of former home, moved to its own new building and consolidated its aquatic collection into the Cleveland Aquarium. The old Gordon Park trailside museum was renovated by Cleveland Aquarium Society volunteers for about $25,000.

The aquarium had 50 freshwater and marine exhibits including sharks, sawfish, seahorses, eels, squid, octopus, and coral. It acquired a pair of Australian lungfish in 1966 and a school of red-bellied piranhas in 1970. Under the Natural History Museum's direction, the aquarium often drew more visitors than the building could handle.

Despite annual deficits experienced during the decade, a city council override of a mayoral veto to increase the admission charges and keep aquarium operations with the museum was performed in 1979.

Structural problems with the building forced the closing of the aquarium to the public in June 1985. The former aquarium site then became a police dog training facility for the City of Cleveland. On April 1, 1986, fish and exhibits were moved to the Cleveland Metroparks Zoo, where they remain today in the Primate, Cat & Aquatics Building.

A New Aquarium in Cleveland
A new aquarium was conceived in 2009. It was originally envisioned as a more ambitious  facility that would cost more than $50 million. However, planning of various forms occurred since the defunct Cleveland Aquarium closed in 1985. Although there were competing interests, the driving force behind the project was Jeffrey Jacobs, a local developer who envisioned it as being part of the Powerhouse, a complex he owned.

The eventual facility was a collaboration. It was financed by a $2 million loan from the City of Cleveland, a $1.25 million investment from Marinescape, and an $11.75 million investment from the Nautica Phase 2 Limited Partnership, an affiliate of Jacobs Entertainment. The facility also supported by FirstEnergy and AMPCO, the parking lot operator for the Nautica Complex.

A ribbon-cutting ceremony was held for the aquarium January 19, 2012, with the aquarium opening to the general public on January 21.

Jacobs Entertainment purchased the aquarium outright in 2014.

Facility
The total cost of the facility was roughly $33 million: $18 million for the building and its related infrastructure and $15 million for aquarium exhibits.

At the January 2012 opening, the aquarium 8 exhibition areas, including Ohio Lakes & Rivers, Lakes & Rivers of the World, Discovery Zone, Indo-Pacific, Northern Pacific, Coastal, Coral Reef and a main Shark SeaTube. It features a  tank with a  acrylic shark tunnel offering panoramic views of marine life, including sharks of various species.

In 2018, the Greater Cleveland Aquarium announced plans to upgrade much of its public space using internal resources and many upcycled materials. In addition to upgrading animal life support systems, the Aquarium enhanced gallery theming, welcomed more than a dozen new species including weedy seadragons and splitfin flashlight fish, and expanded its annual passholder program. Approximately 75% of the Aquarium’s public spaces were part of the capital project. In the transformation, the Aquarium divided Lakes & Rivers of the World into two galleries—Asia & Indonesia Gallery and Tropical Forest Gallery; created an Industry & Habitat Gallery to highlight the positive (biomimicry) and negative (habitat loss, pollution) intersections of nature and industry; added relevant conservation action opportunities in each gallery; created Imagiquarium, a toddler-friendly pretend-and-playspace; and expanded its Invasive Species Hut.

In 2022, the Aquarium welcomed its two millionth general admission walk-in guest  and celebrated the rare births of weedy sea dragons, something only a handful of aquariums around the world have witnessed.

Experiences 
In addition to a calendar of special events including Hauntaquarium, Fin Fest and Scuba Claus, the Greater Cleveland Aquarium offers daily interactive experiences including aquarist talks, animal encounters, SCUBA diver underwater talks and exhibit feedings. The aquarium also offers SCUBA-certified divers the opportunity to dive in its Shark Gallery through its Shark Dive CLE program. (UPDATE-Shark Dive CLE is still on hiatus until further notice {2/15/23})

Conservation Activities 
In 2012, Greater Cleveland Aquarium General Manager Tami Brown established a non-profit Splash Fund “to educate and encourage passion about aquatic life and participation in the conservation of fresh and saltwater habitats through sustainable human practices.” In 2019, Splash Fund Board Members include new General Manager Stephanie White, Deborah Altman, Bruce Akers, Richard Dorman, Scot Rourke and Trevor Gile. Monies raised by this nonprofit fund have been used to conduct regular community Adopt-A-Beach cleanups at Edgewater Park, provide schools with demonstrated need access to life science-based educational programs and works to encourage a more robust Northeast Ohio spotted turtle population. The Splash Fund is one of more than a dozen partners dedicated to the Saving and Protecting Ohio Turtle Diversity (SPOTD) program working to boost the native but threatened spotted turtle population in Northeast Ohio.

References

External links

Zoos in Ohio
Culture of Cleveland
Tourist attractions in Cleveland
Oceanaria in the United States
Museums in Cleveland
Downtown Cleveland